Paschal Glacier is a glacier about 20 nautical miles (37 km) long and 4 nautical miles (7 km) wide, draining northwest between two ridges, the terminal points of which are Mount McCoy and Lewis Bluff. The lower end of this glacier merges with the flow of White Glacier and the larger Land Glacier near Mount McCoy before the latter feature debouches into Land Bay on the coast of Marie Byrd Land. Paschal Glacier was photographed from aircraft of the United States Antarctic Service (USAS), 1939–41, and was mapped by United States Geological Survey (USGS) from surveys and U.S. Navy aerial photography, 1959–65. Named by Advisory Committee on Antarctic Names (US-ACAN) for Evans W. Paschal, Scientific Leader at Byrd Station, 1970.

References

Glaciers of Marie Byrd Land